Peter van der Merwe is a self-taught musicologist, author, and librarian. He was born in Cape Town, South Africa, and has written several books on the history of modern popular and classical music. He studied at the College of Music at the University of Cape Town. He also works as a cataloguer at the municipal library in Pietermaritzburg.

Bibliography
(1989). Origins of the Popular Style: The Antecedents of Twentieth-Century Popular Music. Oxford: Clarendon Press. .
(2005) Roots of the Classical: the Popular Origins of Western Music.

References

South African musicologists
Year of birth missing (living people)
South African College of Music alumni
Living people
Musicians from Cape Town
Afrikaner people
South African people of Irish descent
South African people of Dutch descent
Place of birth missing (living people)